Alok Kumar Mehta (born 3 November 1966) is an Indian politician from the state of Bihar. He is a founder member of Rashtriya Janata Dal and has served as Principal General Secretary of the party. Mehta is said to be political mentor of Tejashwi Yadav.

Political career
A son of Tulsidas Mehta, Alok Kumar Mehta was elected a Member of Legislative Assembly (MLA) for the Ujiyarpur state assembly constituency in the 2015 Bihar Legislative Assembly election. He served as Minister to the Department of Co-operatives in the Government of Bihar, until 2017 when the Chief Minister, Nitish Kumar resigned. His sister Suheli Mehta is also a politician who joined Janata Dal (United), a rival political party of RJD in 2017.

Mehta has also been a Member of Parliament from the Ujiarpur Lok Sabha constituency in 2004. He later lost the seat to Ashwamedh Devi, the widow of veteran Pradip Mahto in 2009. Mehta has been associated with Rashtriya Janata Dal at different times under different charges. He has been the incharge of the RJD for seven states and National General Secretary of youth RJD. He also served as the state General Secretary of Youth Rashtriya Janata Dal.

In his capacity as the Member of Parliament, he has served as the Member of Committee on Private Members` Bills and Resolutions, Member of Committee on Transport, Tourism and Culture; Member of Committee on Absence of Members from the Sittings of the House; Member of Parliamentary Forum on Youth and Member of Committee on Transport, Tourism & Culture.

Mehta has also served as the General Secretary of the RJD. In August 2020, while serving in his capacity as the General Secretary of the party he expelled the three rebel MLAs of the party amidst the upcoming polls of 2020 to Bihar Legislative Assembly.

In 2020 elections to Bihar assembly, Mehta defeated Sheel Kumar Roy of Bhartiya Janata Party with a  margin of over 23000 votes to retain Ujiarpur seat.

In 2023, following the anti- coalition politics of Upendra Kushwaha, the possibility of denting of Kushwaha Vote Bank led Mahagathbandhan (Bihar) and the Rashtriya Janata Dal (RJD) to project Mehta as the leader of Kushwaha caste. In February 2023, RJD organised the celebration of birth anniversary of the socialist leader Jagdeo Prasad, in a bid to reach the community. In all such reach out campaigns, Mehta was kept at the forefront by the party. In one such program organised by RJD, Mehta ensured  his community that they will get proper share in the power structure on the behalf of RJD.

References

External links
Alok Mehta Facebook

1966 births
Living people
Lok Sabha members from Bihar
India MPs 2004–2009
Bihar MLAs 2020–2025
Rashtriya Janata Dal politicians
People from Samastipur district
United Progressive Alliance candidates in the 2014 Indian general election